The 2015 Icelandic Men's Football League Cup was the 20th season of the Icelandic Men's League Cup, a pre-season professional football competition in Iceland. The competition started on 13 February 2015 and concluded on 23 April 2015. FH is the reigning champions, having won their sixth League Cup last year.

The 24 teams from the Úrvalsdeild and 1. deild karla were divided into 3 groups of 8 teams. Every team plays every other team of its group once, home, away or on a neutral ground for a total of 7 games. Each group winner, each runner-up and the two best third-place finishes enter the quarter-finals.

Group stage
The games were played from 13 February to 11 April 2015.

Group 1

Group 2

Group 3

Knockout stage
The top two teams of each group and the two best third-place entered the quarterfinals.

Quarter-finals

|colspan="3" style="background-color:#97DEFF"|16 April 2015

Semi-finals

|colspan="3" style="background-color:#97DEFF"|19 April 2015

Final

|colspan="3" style="background-color:#97DEFF"|23 April 2015

|-
|}

References

External links
Soccerway

2015 domestic association football cups
2015 in Icelandic football
Icelandic Men's Football League Cup